Pascula philpoppei is a species of sea snail, a marine gastropod mollusk, in the family Muricidae, the murex snails or rock snails.

Distribution
This species occurs in the following locations:
 Japan
 Philippines

References

philpoppei
Gastropods described in 2018